Wands is the debut EP by Japanese rock band Wands. The album was released on June 17, 1992 under B-Gram Records label.

Background
The album includes two previously released singles, Sabishisa wa Aki no Iro and Furimuite Dakishimete. The composer of debut single, Seiichirou Kuribayashi later self-covered Wands debut single on his fifth studio album Awanakutemo I Love You. Fifteen years later, vocalist Show self-covered debut single on his cover album "Spoils".

Promotion
Sabishisa wa Aki no Iro was used as an insert song for japanese television drama series Hotel Women. Two weeks later after single release it was included in drama soundtrack before Wands debut album.

Furimuite Dakishimete was used as an opening theme for TV Asahi information program Oh! L Club.

Commercial performance
It reached #10 rank on the Oricon Weekly charts with 4,910 sold copies. It charted for 37 weeks and sold over 349,420 copies. It was 48th best sold album in 1993.

Track listing

References 

1992 EPs
1992 debut albums
Being Inc. albums
Japanese-language albums
Wands (band) albums
Albums produced by Daiko Nagato